The Nieuport-Delage NiD.62 was a French sesquiplane fighter from the early 1930s. This machine was a descendant of a long line of Nieuport-Delage fighters that were designed and built during the years immediately after World War I. The NiD.62 was built in 1931 as a fighter for the Armée de l'Air. It served until the late 1930s, when it was replaced by more modern monoplane fighters. By the time of the outbreak of World War II in September 1939, all of the NiD.62s had been withdrawn from front-line fighter escadrilles but were used as trainers in French flight schools. A few aircraft were employed as target tugs. After the French German Armistice and German occupation of North and West part of France in June 1940, the German Luftwaffe had no interest in the NiD.62s and they were scrapped. None survived the war.

Variants
Nieuport-Delage NiD.62
Single-seat fighter aircraft, powered by a  Hispano-Suiza 12Hb.
Nieuport-Delage NiD.621
Twin-float fighter-trainer, powered by a  Hispano-Suiza 12Hb; Three built.
Nieuport-Delage NiD.622
Single-seat fighter aircraft, powered by a  Hispano-Suiza 12Mdsh piston engine.
Nieuport-Delage NiD.623
One NiD.622 converted for speed records, powered by a  Lorraine 12Fd Courlis.
Nieuport-Delage NiD.624
One NiD.622 converted for racing, powered by a  Lorraine 12Fd Courlis.
Nieuport-Delage NiD.625
One NiD.622 converted for parachute experiments.
Nieuport-Delage NiD.626
Export NiD.622, 12 ordered by Peru in 1933 but Nieuport-Delage NiD.123s delivered instead, powered by  Lorraine 12Hdr engines.
Nieuport-Delage NiD.628
2 prototypes powered by a  Hispano-Suiza 12Mc engine.
Nieuport-Delage NiD.629
50 built with modified wing and ailerons, powered by a  Hispano-Suiza 12Mdsh engine.
Nieuport-Delage NiD.72
All-metal version powered by a  Hispano-Suiza 12Lb engine. Aside from the prototype, three were built for Belgium for evaluation, four went to Brazil which saw action, and three were built for Romania with wooden fuselages.
Nieuport-Delage NiD.82
Single all-metal prototype powered by a  Lorraine 12Ha.

Operators

Brazilian Air Force
Paulista rebels

French Air Force
French Aéronavale

Peruvian Air Force

Royal Romanian Air Force

Turkish Air Force

Specifications (NiD.622)

See also

References

Bibliography

Green, William and Gordon Swanborough. "A Gallic Rarity...The 'One-and-a-Half' Nieuport-Delage". Air International, February 1990, Vol 38 No 2. pp. 75–83, 92–93, 97. 
Green, William and Gordon Swanborough. The Complete Book of Fighters. New York: Smithmark, 1994. 

1930s French fighter aircraft
 062
Sesquiplanes